Kenneth Donald "Slasher" Mackay (24 October 1925 – 13 June 1982) was an Australian cricketer who played in 37 Test matches between 1956 and 1963.

Biography
He was universally known as "Slasher", an ironic reference to his often back-to-the-wall batting style, which was bestowed on him by Toombul District Cricket Club teammate Aub Carrigan. In his first Test at Lord's in 1956 he batted for over four hours in each innings, wearing down the England bowlers with pawky defence and unbreakable concentration. He matured as a Test player to become an unobtrusive but often vital member of Richie Benaud's team that brought Australia out of its late-fifties doldrums in two remarkable series, against the West Indies in 1960–61 and England in 1961. Mackay made important contributions in both, most notably his famous last-wicket stand with Lindsay Kline in the 4th Test against the West Indies in Adelaide which forced a remarkable draw.

Mackay teamed with Benaud and Alan Davidson to provide a high-quality, flexible core of all-rounders that often proved the difference for Australia in tight situations. While lacking the talent of the fast left-arm swing of Davidson and the leg-spin of Benaud, his economical, nagging right-arm medium pace was often strategically useful and occasionally, especially in Pakistan and India, destructive. He was the second-most economic of significant Australian test bowlers, surpassed in miserliness only by Arthur Mailey. He was not a tidy-looking bowler and he shambled up to the wicket, but in the 1961 Ashes series he was Australia's first-change bowler and in the First Test dismissed Ken Barrington, M.J.K. Smith and Raman Subba Row in four balls to give Australia a 321-run first innings lead.

A prolific run-scorer at first-class level, he was more of a bit-part player than a front-line batsman, but averaged healthily for an all-rounder and for many years had the distinction, until passed by Shane Warne (who played many more Tests), of scoring the most Test runs of any Australian without scoring a century. Many of his 13 Test half-centuries were made in crucial situations, often batting with the tail. His final Test series was the 1962-63 Ashes series, when he made 86 not out at such a dull rate that he was dropped due to public demand, but was recalled for the Fourth Test. With Alan Davidson injured he took 3/80 and 1/13, but made only 1 and 3 and was dropped again.

Always highly regarded by teammates and opponents, his popularity with the public grew remarkably late in his career, especially after his Adelaide heroics. A testimonial (Mackay, like most Australian cricketers of the time, was an amateur) with the slogan 'A Bob in for The Slasher' raised the then substantial sum of five thousand pounds, and a street and the main oval at Toombul District Cricket Club were named in his honour. His autobiography, Slasher Opens Up, is regarded as one of the very best cricketer's books, as much for its humour and honesty as for its heroics. Mackay died early in 1982 but, as Jack Pollard wrote in his definitive 'Australian Cricket, the Game and the Players', "while cricket is played in Australia, he will be fondly remembered".

He was appointed a Member of the Order of the British Empire for his services to cricket in 1962.

External links

1925 births
1982 deaths
Australia Test cricketers
Queensland cricketers
Queensland cricket captains
Australian Members of the Order of the British Empire
Australian cricketers
Cricketers from Brisbane
Sportsmen from Queensland